Save Our Shores (SOS) is a marine conservation nonprofit dedicated to "foster thriving and sustainable ecosystems in the Monterey Bay and surrounding habitats through equitable environmental action.”

Over the last 43 years, Save Our Shores has been responsible for establishing the Monterey Bay National Marine Sanctuary (MBNMS), preventing offshore oil drilling along the Central Coast of California, developing the nationally renowned Dockwalkers clean boating program, banning single-use plastic bags in over 30 jurisdictions, and leading various marine conservation beach cleanups and K-12 educational programs throughout the Monterey Bay area.

Today, the organization primarily focuses on advocacy, marine debris (specifically plastic pollution), and helping community members become ocean stewards. This includes educating the greater community about local watersheds and marine protected areas (MPA), tackling the plastic pollution problem by passing local ordinances and hosting cleanups, supporting habitat conservation efforts, educating and empowering community members to help them face oncoming climate change, and continuing to implement their historic Sanctuary Stewards and Dockwalker programs.

Programs

Beach, River, Kayak, and Inland Cleanups 
Save Our Shores has been conducting beach, river, kayak, and inland cleanups since 1978. The nonprofit primarily hosts its public, private, and school cleanups throughout Santa Cruz and Monterey counties. In 2017, Save Our Shores led a total of 243 cleanups. During these cleanups, Save Our Shores and community volunteers removed over 8 tons of waste. Data is collected from each cleanup to identify pollution and marine debris issues impacting the Monterey Bay National Marine Sanctuary and the Pacific Ocean at large. For example, in 2017, the top three items collected were small plastic pieces (approximately 13,000) cigarette butts (over 12,000), like microplastics, and styrofoam pieces (nearly 7,000). Many of Save Our Shores’ advocacy efforts, including local bans on single-use plastics and polystyrene containers, are driven by cleanup data analysis.

Sanctuary Stewards 
Sanctuary Stewards are the core volunteer force of Save Our Shores dedicated to conserving the Monterey Bay National Marine Sanctuary. The program prepares community members to become educators, advocates and experts on issues affecting the Monterey Bay and work toward local pollution prevention.  Sanctuary Stewards give academic presentations, lead beach cleanups, participate in community events, and work on various research projects, such as data collection and entry.

Dockwalkers  
Developed in 1999, the Dockwalker program provides one-on-one clean boater outreach in local harbors. Dockwalkers share clean boating best practices and provide boaters with clean boating kits, such as supplies to clean up small oil spills and resources to discard used oil and waste products. Due to its success, the Save Our Shores Dockwalker program was adopted and implemented statewide by the California Coastal Commission in 2001.

References

External links 
 

Environmental organizations based in California
Santa Cruz, California
Water resource policy